Omonadus is a genus of antlike flower beetles in the family Anthicidae. There are about seven described species in Omonadus.

Species
These seven species belong to the genus Omonadus:
 Omonadus anticemaculatus (Pic, 1900)
 Omonadus confucii
 Omonadus floralis (Linnaeus, 1758) (narrow-necked grain beetle)
 Omonadus formicarius (Goeze, 1777)
 Omonadus lateriguttatus (De Marseul, 1879)
 Omonadus phoenicius (Truqui, 1855)
 Omonadus signatellus (Krekich-Strassoldo, 1928)

Gallery

References

Further reading

External links

 

Anthicidae
Articles created by Qbugbot